Wordscapes is a word puzzle video game created by the American studio PeopleFun, available on Android and IOS. Wordscapes was a top 100 ranked game on the Google Play Store, and the App Store. As of 2020, over 14 million people have played Wordscapes.

Gameplay 
The game overall is a mix of Boggle and crossword puzzles. To solve the puzzle, the player must find every word using the letters that are located in the circle at the bottom of the screen. There are anywhere from 3 to 7 letters in the circle, depending on the level being played. There are also bonus words, which the player can solve for extra coins. The game currently contains 6,000 levels and an infinite number of extra master levels that players can access after completing the first 6,000. The game publishes a daily puzzle for each day.

Reception  
Complex rated the game as one of the best free games that is available for the iPhone.

Spin offs
Word Mocha (2017) 
Based on the original game it retains the similar Boggle feature with coffee and hot drink backdrops and also lacks the crossword puzzle feature. 

Wordscapes Uncrossed (2017) 
Based on the original game it retains the similar Boggle-esque features but lacks the crossword puzzle elements.

Wordscapes in Bloom (2018)
Similar to the original game but features a botanical theme with predominantly flowery and garden backdrops to levels.

Wordscapes Search (2019)
A word search with similar backdrops and themes to other Wordscapes games.

Wordscapes Shapes (2019)
Blends elements of a word search with elements of a Jigsaw Puzzle combined with similar themes and mechanics to previous Wordscapes games.

References 

Android (operating system) games
IOS games
Word puzzle video games
2017 video games
Video games developed in the United States